Marco Haller (born 1 April 1991) is an Austrian professional road bicycling racer, who currently rides for UCI WorldTeam .

Career
Born in Sankt Veit an der Glan, Haller took his first win on the UCI World Tour, at the 2012 Tour of Beijing, in a mass sprint where he had the upper hand on established sprinters such as Alessandro Petacchi and Elia Viviani. In 2015, he was the surprise winner of the Tour des Fjords after featuring in the last stage's breakaway.

He was named in the start list for the 2015 Tour de France for the first time where he got into the breakaway of the day on stage 16 and was caught by the bunch before the last climb of the day together with Adam Hansen. He won the Austrian National Road Race Championships in 2015. In May 2019, he was named in the startlist for the 2019 Giro d'Italia.

Major results

2009
 Tour de l'Abitibi
1st Stages 1, 4, 5 & 6
 3rd  Road race, UCI Juniors World Championships
 4th Road race, UEC European Junior Road Championships
2011
 2nd Poreč Trophy
 5th Road race, UCI Under-23 Road World Championships
2012
 1st Stage 4 Tour of Beijing
2013
 1st  Mountains classification, Three Days of De Panne
 7th Overall Tour des Fjords
1st Stage 3 (TTT)
 7th Overall Arctic Race of Norway
 10th Le Samyn
2014
 1st Stage 8 Tour of Austria
 2nd Road race, National Under-23 Road Championships
2015
 1st  Road race, National Road Championships
 1st  Overall Tour des Fjords
1st  Young rider classification
 3rd Gran Premio Nobili Rubinetterie
2016
 10th Grand Prix Impanis-Van Petegem
2018
 10th Scheldeprijs
2019
 1st  Overall Bay Classic Series
1st  Sprints classification
1st Stage 1
 7th Scheldeprijs
 9th Eschborn–Frankfurt
2020
 8th Cadel Evans Great Ocean Road Race
2021
 2nd Road race, National Road Championships
 6th Overall Deutschland Tour
 10th E3 Saxo Bank Classic
2022
 1st BEMER Cyclassics
 1st Stage 4 Tour of Norway
 5th Road race, National Road Championships

Grand Tour general classification results timeline

References

External links

1991 births
Living people
Austrian male cyclists
People from Sankt Veit an der Glan
Sportspeople from Carinthia (state)